On 15 September 1944, United States Marine Corps forces landed on the southwestern shore of the island of Peleliu in the Palau island chain, 470 nautical miles due east of the Philippine island of Mindanao. This action, called Operation Stalemate II by American planners, 
was a phase in the Pacific Theatre of World War II. Whether possession of the island was necessary for the Allied cause has been the source of much controversy. 

Peleliu was the least-known island that the US invaded in the Pacific Theatre. Pre-war maps were sorely lacking and the results of photoreconnaissance were poor. Thus, the Marines were completely unprepared for the hard, sharp surface of blistering hot bare coral over much of the landing area.

Defeating the entrenched Japanese forces turned out to be far more arduous than anticipated. Two regiments of Army troops were unexpectedly needed to finish conquest of the island. Peleliu was finally declared secure on 15 November 1944.

US Command Structure

Naval 
The roles of Commander in Chief, Pacific Ocean Areas (CINCPOA) and Commander in Chief, U.S. Pacific Fleet (CINCPAC), were both exercised by Admiral Chester W. Nimitz from his headquarters at Pearl Harbor, Hawaii.

Since the Palaus lie in the Southwest Pacific, their capture was the responsibility of the U.S. Third Fleet, led by Admiral William F. Halsey from aboard his flagship, fast battleship New Jersey. 

The ships and embarked troops of Operation Stalemate II, were under the overall command of Rear Admiral Theodore S. Wilkinson aboard amphibious command ship Mount Olympus.

Ground Troops 
Marine Corps planning for Stalemate II was conducted by Major General Julian C. Smith. However, because the III Amphibious Corps was still struggling with the capture of Guam, operational command for the Palaus was turned over to Major General Roy S. Geiger.

III Marine Amphibious Corps (Maj. Gen. Roy S. Geiger, USMC)
 Peleliu landing, 15 Sep:  1st Marine Division (Maj. Gen. William H. Rupertus, USMC)
 Angaur landing, 17 Sep:   81st Infantry ("Wildcat") Division (Maj. Gen. Paul J. Mueller, USA)

US Forces

Capture of Peleliu 
  III Marine Amphibious Corps
 Major General Roy S. Geiger, USMC
  1st Marine Division
 Major General William H. Rupertus
 Asst. Div. Cmdr.: Brig. Gen. Oliver P. Smith
 Chief of Staff: Col. John T. Selden
 CO HQ Battalion: Col. Joseph F. Hankins (KIA 3 Oct), Lt. Col. Austin C. Shofner
 Personnel officer (G-1): Maj. William E. Benedict (to 23 Sep), Lt. Col. Harold O. Deakin
 Intelligence officer (G-2): Lt. Col. John W. Scott Jr.
 Operations officer (G-3): Lt. Col. Lewis J. Fields
 Logistics officer (G-4): Lt. Col. Harvey C. Tschirgi

 Left sector (White Beaches 1 & 2)
  1st Marine Regiment
 Colonel Lewis B. "Chesty" Puller
 Exec. Ofc.: Lt. Col. Richard P. Ross Jr.
 1st Battalion (Maj. Raymond G. Davis)
 2nd Battalion (Lt. Col. Russell E. Honsowetz)
 3rd Battalion (Lt. Col. Stephen V. Sabol)
 Co. A of the following: 
 1st Engineer Battalion, 1st Pioneer Battalion, 1st Medical Battalion, 1st Tank Battalion

 Center sector (Orange Beaches 1 & 2)
  5th Marine Regiment
 Colonel Harold D. "Bucky" Harris
 Exec. Ofc.: Lt. Col. Lewis W. Walt
 1st Battalion (Lt. Col. Robert W. Boyd)
 2nd Battalion (Maj. Gordon D. Gayle)
 3rd Battalion (Lt. Col. Austin C. Shofner (to 15 Sep), Maj. John C. Gustafson)
 Co. B of the following: 
 1st Engineer Battalion, 1st Pioneer Battalion, 1st Medical Battalion, 1st Tank Battalion (reduced)

 Right sector (Orange Beach 3)
  7th Marine Regiment
 Colonel Herman H. "Hard-Headed" Hanneken
 Exec. Ofc.: Lt. Col. Norman Hussa
 1st Battalion (Lt. Col. John J. Gormley)
 2nd Battalion (Lt. Col. Spenser S. Berger)
 3rd Battalion (Maj. Edward H. Hurst)
 Co. C of the following: 
 1st Engineer Battalion, 1st Pioneer Battalion, 1st Medical Battalion, 1st Tank Battalion (reduced)

 Landed after D-Day
  11th Marine Regiment (Artillery)
 Colonel William H. Harrison
 Exec. Ofc.: Lt. Col. Edison L. Lyman
 1st Battalion (Lt. Col. Richard W. Wallace)
 2nd Battalion (Lt. Col. Noah P. Wood, Jr.)
 3rd Battalion (Lt. Col. Charles M. Nees)
 4th Battalion (Lt. Col. Louis C.Reinberg)

 Other units
 12th Antiaircraft Artillery Battalion
 1st Amphibian Tractor Battalion
 3rd Armored Amphibian Tractor Battalion
 4th, 5th, 6th Marine War Dog Platoons
 UDT 6 and UDT 7

Capture of Angaur 
  81st Infantry ("Wildcat") Division (Army)
 Major General Paul J. Mueller
 Conquest of Angaur, 17 - 20 Sep
 321st Infantry Regiment (also landed on Peleliu, 23 Sep)
 323rd Infantry Regiment (also landed on Peleliu, 15 Oct)

Japanese forces 

Palau District Group
Lieutenant General Inoue Sadao (HQ on Koror Island)
Vice Admiral Yoshioka Ito
Major General Kenjiro Murai

 14th Division (Lt. Gen. Sadao)
 Peleliu Sector Unit (Lt. Col. Kunio Nakagawa)
 2nd Infantry Regiment, Reinforced
 2nd Bttn. / 2nd Infantry Regiment
 3rd Bttn. / 2nd Infantry Regiment
 3rd Bttn. / 15th Infantry Regiment
 346th Bttn. / 53rd Independent Mixed Brigade

Notes

References

See also 
Orders of battle involving United States Marine forces in the Pacific Theatre of World War II:

 Battle of Guadalcanal order of battle
 Battle of Tarawa order of battle
 Battle of Saipan order of battle
 Guam (1944) order of battle
 Battle of Leyte opposing forces
 Battle of Iwo Jima order of battle
 Okinawa ground order of battle

Bibliography
 
 
 

United States Marine Corps
World War II orders of battle